The Ihavandhoo Amina Dhiyo Memorial Hospital (IADMH) Ihavandhoo hospital is a government owned health institute established on 2 July 2003 in Ihavandhoo in the Maldives. The hospital was previously run in former Health Post which was built by the Ministry of Women's Affairs. Later on 1 March 1980 the health centre was relocated to a new building which is in the north of Ihavandhoo near Upper North Utilities Limited (Ihavandhoo Power House). The hospital has better facilities and services than other health centres in Haa Alif Atoll apart from general consultation.

History
With only three staff, the health service was first initiated in Ihavandhoo on 1 June 1979 at the former building of Ihavandhoo Office. The three health workers were Thahira Jauhary (ha. Ihavandhoo Vaijeheyge), Hawwa Hassan (ha. Ihavandhoo Gulbakage) and Mariyam Abbas (ha. Ihavandhoo Huvandhumaage).

Though at that time delivery cases were handled personally by some midwives, in 1986 a lady who completed midwifery course joined the service. On 15 December of the following year a new health worker, Abdul Wahid Abdulla started working. With Maryam Abbas, midwife Aishath Ibrahim and Abdul Wahid Abdulla, the service was carried out in previous Ihavandhoo school building office block as a health section. Later the health section shifted to island office. During this time the only service that was provided by the health section was dressing. There were no pharmacy or medicines. This made the work more difficult for the health care providers in the island.

After two years an ANC clinic was opened in Funamage. At the time there were four working staff, Abdul Wahid Abdulla, Haulath Maahira, Aishath Ibrahim and Mariyam Abbas. Later Mariyam Abbas lost her post.

Today the Ihavandhoo Health Centre is one of the best healthcare providers among the atoll health centres. In the course of 10 years of service, the health centre has been gradually developing and changed its service for 24 hours on 12 November 2007. So the health centre has ranked as first class health centre according to the Maldiveian government policy. The health centre has some of the facilities apart from general consultation. The health centre also provides Aasandha insurance scheme to every Maldivian.

Facilities
General outpatient services
Laboratory services
Dressing and injection
Family plan
ANC clinic
Ambulance service
Blood transfusion

External links
 http://www.ihavandhoohc.blogspot.com

Medical and health organisations based in the Maldives